CIA cryptonyms are code names or code words used by the U.S. Central Intelligence Agency (CIA) to refer to projects, operations, persons, agencies, etc.

Format of cryptonyms
CIA cryptonyms sometimes contain a two character prefix called a digraph, which designates a geographical or functional area. Certain digraphs were changed over time; for example, the digraph for the Soviet Union changed at least twice.

The rest is either an arbitrary dictionary word, or occasionally the digraph and the cryptonym combine to form a dictionary word (e.g., AEROPLANE) or can be read out as a simple phrase (e.g., WIBOTHER, read as "Why bother!"). Cryptonyms are sometimes written with a slash after the digraph, e.g., ZR/RIFLE, and sometimes in one sequence, e.g., ZRRIFLE. The latter format is the more common style in CIA documents.

Examples from publications by former CIA personnel show that the terms "code name" and "cryptonym" can refer to the names of operations as well as to individual persons. TRIGON, for example, was the code name for Aleksandr Ogorodnik, a member of the Ministry of Foreign Affairs in the former Soviet Union, whom the CIA developed as a spy; HERO was the code name for Col. Oleg Penkovsky, who supplied data on the nuclear readiness of the Soviet Union during the Cuban Missile Crisis of 1962. According to former CIA Director Richard M. Helms: "The code names for most Agency operations are picked in sequence from a sterile list, with care taken not to use any word that might give a clue to the activity it covers. On some large projects, code names are occasionally specially chosen—GOLD, SILVER, PBSUCCESS, CORONA. When Robert F. Kennedy requested a code name for the government-wide plan that Richard Goodwin was drafting, an exception was made. Goodwin was on the White House staff, and the plan concerned Cuba. Occasionally the special code names come close to the nerve, as did MONGOOSE." A secret joint program between the Mexico City CIA station and the Mexican secret police to wiretap the Soviet and Cuban embassies was code-named ENVOY.

Some cryptonyms relate to more than one subject, e.g., a group of people. In this case, the basic cryptonym, e.g., LICOZY, will designate the whole group, while each group member is designated by a sequence number, e.g., LICOZY/3, which can also be written LICOZY-3, or just L-3.

Digraphs

Partial list of digraphs and probable definitions

 AE: Soviet Union (1960s)
 AL: Brazil
 AM: Cuba (also JM)
 AV: Uruguay
 BE: Poland
 BG: Albania
 BI: Argentina
 CA: West Germany
 CK: CIA Soviet and East Europe division sensitive cases (late 1970s)
 DB: Iraq
 DI: Czechoslovakia
 DM: SFRY / Yugoslavia
 DN: South Korea
 DU: Peru
 EC: Ecuador
 ES: Guatemala (also PB)
 FU: Chile
 GT: CIA Soviet and East Europe division sensitive cases (1980s)
 HA: Indonesia (1958)
 IA: Angola
 IR: Philippines?
 JM: Cuba (also AM)
 KK: Israel
 KU: CIA and CIA components
 LC: China
 LN: United States
 LI: Mexico City
 MH: Worldwide operation.
 MJ: Palestinian-related
 MK: CIA Technical Services Division (1950s/1960s)
 MO: Thailand
 OD: Other US Government Departments (1960s)
 PB: Guatemala (also ES)
 PD: Soviet Union (1980s)
 PO: Japan
 SD: Iran
 SM: United Kingdom
 ST: CIA Directorate of Operations, Far East division, China Branch
 SZ: Switzerland
 TP: Iran (1953)
 TU: South Vietnam
 WI: Democratic Republic of the Congo (1960s)
 EU-RN: Intelligence intercept program of CIA Staff D ops, the group that worked directly with the NSA (National Security Agency).

Unidentified digraphs
DT, ER, FJ, HB, HO, HT, JU, KM, KO, QK, SC, SE, SG, WO, WS, ZI

Known cryptonyms

 Adam: Guatemala City
 AEACRE: Ukrainian Supreme Liberation Council (ZP/UHVR) radio broadcasts
 AECASSOWARY-2: Mykola Lebed, President of Prolog and CIA Principal Agent
 AECROAK: Radio station called Nasha Rossiya
 AEFOXTROT: Yuri Ivanovich Nosenko, a Soviet defector.
 AELADLE: Anatoliy Golitsyn, Soviet defector and former KGB officer.
 AERODYNAMIC: Psychological warfare operation
 AERANTER: Sub-project of Operation AERODYNAMIC
 AESCREEN: Soviet Bloc division's translation and analysis unit
 AETENURE: Prolog Research and Publishing Association, Inc.
 AMBIDDY-1: Manuel Artime.
 AMBLOOD: Luis Torroella y Martin Rivero, a CIA agent.
 AMCLATTER-1: Bernard Barker, one of the Watergate burglars.
 AMBUD
 AMCLEOPATRA
 AMCOBRA
 AMCROW
 AMCRUZ or AMCRUX?
 AMFOX
 AMGLOSSY
 AMHALF
 AMJUDGE
 AMLASH: Plan to assassinate Fidel Castro associated mainly with Rolando Cubela. AMLASH has been referred to as a "basically one-person Cubela operation".
 AMLASH-1: Rolando Cubela Secades, a Cuban official involved in plot to kill Fidel Castro in 1963.
 AMOT: Cuban exile informants of David Sánchez Morales.
 AMPALM-4
 AMQUACK: Che Guevara, Argentinian (later Cuban) guerrilla leader.
 AMTHUG: Fidel Castro, Prime Minister of Cuba 1959–1976.
 AMTRUNK: A CIA plan by New York Times journalist Tad Szulc initiated in February 1963, also called the "Leonardo Plan", that was "an attempt to find disgruntled military officials in Cuba who might be willing to recruit higher military officials in a plot to overthrow Castro", as well as to overthrow the Cuban government "by means of a conspiracy among high-level ... leaders of the government culminating in a coup d'etat". AMTRUNK has also been described as a "CIA-DIA Task Force on Cuba", and as "a plodding bureaucratic effort" that "had worked for months to identify Cuban leaders who might be able to stage a coup".
 AMWHIP-1: Business associate of Santo Trafficante Jr. who was in contact with Rolando Cubela (AMLASH) in 1963.
 AMWORLD: A plan initiated June 28, 1963, to overthrow the Castro regime in a coup on December 1, 1963 (C-Day), that would have installed Juan Almeida Bosque, a top ranking Cuban military officer, as the new head of state. Some Cuban exiles referred to C-Day as "Plan Omega".
 BGGYPSY: Russia; Russian; Communist
 BOND: Puerto Barrios
 Caesar: Quetzaltenango
 CALLIGERIS: Carlos Castillo Armas
 CARTEL: Ukrainian Supreme Liberation Council (ZP/UHVR) radio broadcasts
 CKGULL: CIA Polish agent Ryszard Kukliński (also QTGULL)
 CKSPHERE, CKVANQUISH: Adolf Tolkachev
 CKTRIGON: Aleksandr Dmitrievich Ogorodnik
 CKTWINE: Boris Yuzhin
 CKUTOPIA, CKQUARTZ: Victor Sheymov
 CORONA: the CIA's first satellite Reconnaissance program, 1958
 DBACHILLES: 1995 effort to support a military coup in Iraq.
 DBANABASIS commenced Fall 2002, operation to train Iraqis in Area 51 in Nevada and then to run them on missions of sabotage and assassination inside Iraq. 
 DBROCKSTARS: Iraqi spy ring recruited by the CIA shortly before the 2003 invasion of Iraq.
 Doc: Mazatenango
 DTFROGS: El Salvador
 DYCLAIM: Central Intelligence Agency (CIA)
 Eddie: El Quiché
 ESCOBILLA, Guatemalan national
 ESMERALDITE, labor informant affiliated with AFL-sponsored labor movement
 ESSENCE, Guatemalan anti-Communist leader
 FJHOPEFUL, military base
 Frank: Jutiapa, Guatemala
 Goss: Cobán, Guatemala
 GROSSBAHN: Otto von Bolschwing, Sicherheitsdienst officer who later served as a spy for CIA
 GTACCORD: GRU colonel Vladimir Mikhailovich Vasilyev
 GTCOWL: KGB officer Sergei Vorontsov ("Stas")
 GTFITNESS: KGB Gennady Varenik
 GTGAUZE: KGB major Sergey Motorin
 GTGENTILE: KGB lieutenant colonel Valery F. Martynov
 GTTICKLE: Oleg Gordievsky
 GTJOGGER: KGB lieutenant colonel Vladimir M. Piguzov
 GTMILLION: GRU lieutenant colonel Gennady Smetanin
 GTWEIGH: KGB officer Leonid Polyshuk
 Hank, Zacapa (Guatemalan base)
 HTAUTOMAT: Photointerpretation center for the Lockheed U-2 reconnaissance aircraft project.
 HTKEEPER: Mexico City
 HTLINGUAL: Mail interception operation 1952–1973.
 HTNEIGH: National Committee for Free Albania (NCFA) [1949-mid1950s]
 HTPLUME: Panama
 Ike: San José
 Jack, Florida, Honduras
 JMADD: CIA air base near city of Retalhuleu, Guatemala 1960–1961
 JMATE: Cover Action plans against Cuba 1960–1961, resulting in Bay of Pigs invasion
 JMBELL: CIA office (location unknown) 1961
 JMBLUG: John Peurifoy, U.S. Ambassador to Guatemala.
 JMFURY: Preparatory strikes against Cuban airfields before Bay of Pigs Invasion 1961
 JMGLOW: CIA Washington 1961
 JMTIDE: CIA air base in Puerto Cabezas, Nicaragua 1961
 JMTRAX: CIA covert air base/training camp in Guatemala 1960–1961
 JMWAVE: CIA station in Miami (that operated against Cuba).
 JMZIP: CIA office (location unknown) 1961
 Kent: Carias Viejas, Honduras
 KKMOUNTAIN: CIA-Mossad cooperation in the 1960s
 KMFLUSH: Nicaragua
 KMPAJAMA: Mexico
 KMPLEBE: Peru
 KUBARK: Central Intelligence Agency (CIA); CIA Headquarters, Langley
 KUBASS: CIA Directorate of Science and Technology (DS&T)
 KUCAGE: CIA Psychological and Paramilitary Operations Staff
 KUCHAP: CIA Deputy Director for Intelligence (DDI)
 KUCITY: CIA Technical Services Division
 KUCLUB: CIA Office of Communications
 KUDESK: CIA Counterintelligence Center
 KUDOVE: CIA Deputy Director for Operations (DDO)
 KUFIRE: CIA Foreign Intelligence Staff
 KUGOWN: CIA Psychological and Paramilitary Operations Staff
 KUHOOK: CIA Paramilitary Operations Staff
 KUJAZZ: CIA Office of National Estimates
 KUJUMP: CIA Contact Division
 KUKNOB: CIA Office of Scientific Intelligence (OSI)
 KUMONK: CIA Office of Political Analysis (OPA)
 KUPALM: CIA Office of Central Reference
 KURIOT: CIA Technical Services Division
 KUSODA: Center for CIA Security
 KUTUBE: CIA Foreign Intelligence Staff
 KUTWIN: Office of Strategic Services (OSS)
 KUWOLF: CIA Political and Psychological Staff
 KUWRAP: CIA Counterintelligence Center
 Larry: Entre Ríos, Guatemala
 LCFLUTTER: Polygraph, sometimes supplanted by truth drugs: Sodium Amytal (amobarbital), Sodium Pentothal (thiopental), and Seconal (secobarbital) to induce regression in the subject.
 LCPANGS: Costa Rica
 LNHARP: United States Government
 LIENVOY: Joint CIA-Mexican Wiretap/intercept program in Mexico.
 LINC, LINCOLN: PBSUCCESS Headquarters in Florida
 LIONIZER: Guatemalan refugee group in Mexico
 LITENSOR: Codename of CIA informant Adolfo López Mateos, president of Mexico.
 LITEMPO: Spy network, operated between 1956–1969, to exchange information with Mexican top officers.
 LITEMPO-1 Emilio Bolanos, nephew of Gustavo Díaz-Ordaz Bolaños (Secretary of the Interior in the cabinet of president Adolfo López Mateos)
 LITEMPO-2: Gustavo Díaz-Ordaz Bolaños, Secretary of the Interior in the cabinet of president Adolfo López Mateos and President of Mexico 1964–1970.
 LITEMPO-4: Fernando Gutiérrez Barrios, Head of the Dirección Federal de Seguridad (DFS), the top Mexican intelligence agency, at the midst of the dirty war (1964–1970).
 LITEMPO-8 (later LITEMPO-14): Luis Echeverría, Secretary of the Interior in the cabinet of president Gustavo Díaz-Ordaz Bolaños and President of Mexico 1970–1976.
 LITEMPO-12: Miguel Nazar Haro, a LITEMPO-4 subordinate, known to be in contact with CIA station chief Winston M. Scott; Nazar Haro later became head of the DFS intelligence agency (1978–1982)
 LILINK: Front company providing cover to CIA agents in Mexico City.
 LIOVAL-1: CIA agent, posing as English teacher in Mexico City.
 LICOWL-1: CIA agent, owner of a small business near the Soviet embassy in Mexico City.
 LICOZY-1, LICOZY-3 and LICOZY-5: Anti-KGB double agents in Mexico City.
 LICALLA: CIA surveillance posts for the Soviet embassy in Mexico City.
 LIMBRACE: Security team for the CIA station in Mexico.
 LISAMPAN: Operation "bugging" the Cuban embassy in Mexico City.
 LICOBRA: Operation watching suspicious members of the ruling Mexican PRI party, the ministry of the exterior and other Mexican government officials.
 LIFIRE: Operation gathering intelligence from Mexican air travel and acquiring travel manifests from international flights.
 MHCHAOS: Surveillance of antiwar activists during the Vietnam War.
 Mike: Asunción Mita, Guatemala
 MJTRUST/2: Ali Hassan Salameh
 MKCHICKWIT: Identify new drug developments in Europe and Asia and obtain samples, part of MKSEARCH.
 MKDELTA: Operational arm of MKULTRA, subsequently became MKNAOMI.
 MKNAOMI: Stockpiling of lethal biological and chemical agents, successor to MKDELTA.
 MKOFTEN: Testing effects of biological and chemical agents, part of MKSEARCH.
 MKSEARCH: MKULTRA after 1964, mind control research.
 MKULTRA: covert funding mechanism for research and development of behavioral modification techniques. Renamed MKSEARCH in 1964.
 MPBLOTCH – CIA-developed trace metals detection test during the Vietnam War.
 Nick: Gualán, Guatemala
 ODACID: U.S. Embassy, United States Department of State/U.S. embassy
 ODEARL: United States Department of Defense
 ODENVY: Federal Bureau of Investigation
 ODEUM: Gehlen Organization (1950–1951)
 ODOATH: United States Navy
 ODOPAL: Counterintelligence Corps, United States Army
 ODUNIT: United States Air Force
 ODURGE: Immigration and Naturalization Service
 ODYOKE: Federal government of the United States
 OFFSPRING: Gehlen Organization (1949–1950)
 PANCHO: Carlos Castillo Armas
 PBFORTUNE: CIA project to supply forces opposed to Guatemala's President Arbenz with weapons, supplies, and funding; predecessor to PBSUCCESS.
 PBHISTORY: CIA project to gather and analyze documents from the Arbenz government in Guatemala that would incriminate Arbenz as a communist.
 PBJOINTLY: Operation that built a tunnel from the American sector of Berlin, to the Russian sector.
 PBCRUET: Psychological warfare radio broadcasts outside Ukraine
 PBPRIME: United States
 PBRUMEN: Cuba
 PBS, PBSUCCESS: Central Intelligence Agency covert operation to overthrow Arbenz government in Guatemala
 POCAPON: Taketora Ogata, Japanese politician in the 1950s.
 PODAM: Matsutarō Shōriki, Japanese businessman and politician.
 PYREX: Language units in WEMCA station
 QJWIN: European assassin. Also described as an "assassin recruiter".
 QKBROIL: Psychological warfare in Romania
 QKCIGAR: United States Government
 QKELUSION: West German Social Democratic Party (SPD)
 QKFLOWAGE: United States Information Agency
 QKENCHANT: CIA program associated with E. Howard Hunt (1918–2007), who with G. Gordon Liddy and others, was one of the White House's "plumbers"—a secret team of operatives charged with fixing "leaks".
 QKFLOWAGE: United States Information Agency
 QKHILLTOP: CIA program to study Chinese Communist brainwashing techniques and to develop interrogation techniques.
 QRDYNAMIC: A financial support program for Ukrainian-language publications to offset Soviet propaganda 
 QRTENURE: Covert operation in New York City
 QTGULL: CIA Polish agent Ryszard Kukliński (also CKGULL)
 RANTER: Psychological warfare radio broadcasts from Greece
 RUFUS: Carlos Castillo Armas
 SARANAC: training site in Nicaragua
 SCRANTON: training base for radio operators near Nicaragua
 SD/PLOD/1: deputy prime minister for the Interim government of Iran Abbas Amir-Entezam
 SGUAT: CIA Station in Guatemala
 SHELLAC: Clandestine radio station in Romania, part of QKBROIL
 SHERWOOD: CIA radio broadcasting program based in Nicaragua begun on May 1, 1954
 SKILLET, Whiting Willauer, U.S. Ambassador to Honduras
 SKIMMER, The "Group" CIA cover organization supporting Castillo Armas
 SLINC, telegram indicator for PBSUCCESS Headquarters in Florida
 STANDEL: Jacobo Arbenz, President of Guatemala
 STORMY: LSD, Lysergic Acid Diethylamide, psychedelic drug experiments on public.
 SMOTH: UK Secret Intelligence Service (MI6)
 SYNCARP: the "Junta", Castillo Armas' political organization headed by Córdova Cerna
 TPBEDAMN: U.S. operation to counter communist subversion in Iran with propaganda and bribes.
 TPAJAX: Overthrow of Mohammed Mossadeq, Prime Minister of Iran, in the 1953 Iranian coup orchestrated by a joint US/UK operation
 TPCREDO: Italy
 TPROACH: Yugoslavia
 TPTONIC: National Committee for Free Europe (NCFE)
 UNREST: Otto von Bolschwing
 UPTHRUST: Konrad Adenauer
 USAGE: Otto von Bolschwing
 UTILITY: Reinhard Gehlen, first president of the Bundesnachrichtendienst
 WASHTUB: Operation to plant Soviet arms in Nicaragua
 WEMCA: CIA communications station in Athens, Greece
 WSBURNT: Guatemala
 WSHOOFS: Honduras
 ZIPPER: Gehlen Organization (1951–1956)
 ZRRIFLE: An assassination plot targeting Fidel Castro

Operations and projects

 APPLE: Agent team seen in 1952 by CIA/OPC as best bet to successfully continue BGFIEND Project aimed to harass/overthrow Albanian communist regime. Team was arrested, communists controlled radio ops for 16 months, luring more agents into Albania in 1953, and trying and executing original agents in 1954 to suddenly end BGFIEND.
 ARTICHOKE: Anti-interrogation project. Precursor to MKULTRA.
 AZORIAN: Project to raise the Soviet submarine K-129 from the Pacific Ocean.
 BGGYPSY: Communist.
 BIRCH
 BLACKSHIELD: A-12 aircraft reconnaissance missions off Okinawa.
 BLUEBIRD: mind control program
 BOND: Puerto Barrios, Guatemala.
 CATIDE: Bundesnachrichtendienst
 CHARITY: Joint CIA/OSO-Italian Naval Intelligence information gathering operation against Albania (1948–1951).
 CHERRY: Covert assassination / destabilization operation during Vietnam war, targeting Prince (later King) Norodom Sihanouk and the government of Cambodia. Disbanded.
 CKTAW: Wiretap operation in Moscow, Russia
 DTFROGS: El Salvador
 ESCOBILLA: Guatemalan national.
 ESMERALDITE: Labor informant affiliated with AFL-sponsored labor movement.
 ESQUIRE: James Bamford, author of "The Puzzle Palace".
 ESSENCE: Guatemalan anti-communist leader.
 FDTRODPINT: Afghan tribal agents, formerly known as GESENIOR, reactivated in the 1990s by the CIA to hunt Mir Aimal Kasi and later Osama bin Laden.
 FIR
 FUBELT: operation against Salvador Allende in Chile
 FJGROUND: Grafenwöhr,  Germany paramilitary training ground.
 FJHOPEFUL: Military base.
 FPBERM: Yugoslavia
 GESENIOR: Afghan tribal agents working with the CIA during the Soviet–Afghan War. Later called FDTRODPINT.
 GPFLOOR: Lee Harvey Oswald
 GPIDEAL: John F. Kennedy, US president.
 GRATTIC : Pyotr Popov, CIA Soviet agent
 GUSTO: Project to design a follow-on to the Lockheed U-2 reconnaissance aircraft. Succeeded RAINBOW. Succeeded by OXCART.
 HBFAIRY: France
 HTCURIO: American or U.S. [Not Government]
 IAFEATURE: Operation to support the National Union for the Total Independence of Angola (UNITA) and the National Liberation Front of Angola (FNLA) during the Angolan civil war.
 IDIOM: Initial work by Convair on a follow-on to the Lockheed U-2 reconnaissance aircraft. Later moved into GUSTO.
 Project JBEDICT: Tripartite Stay-Behind project.
 JENNIFER: Document control system for Project AZORIAN.
 KEMPSTER: Project to reduce the radar cross section (RCS) of the inlets of the Lockheed A-12 reconnaissance aircraft.
 KMHYMNAL: Maine-built motor sailer JUANITA purchased by CIA to use as floating, clandestine, propaganda broadcast facility in Mediterranean/Adriatic (1950–53).
 LEMON
 LNWILT: US Counterintelligence Corps (CIC)
 LPMEDLEY: Surveillance of telegraphic information exiting or entering the United States.
 MAGPIE: US Army Labor Service Organization
 MATADOR: Project to recover section of Soviet submarine K-129 dropped during Project AZORIAN.  Cancelled after Soviet protest.
 MOCKINGBIRD: a wire tapping operation of two journalists in 1963 to determine the source of leaked information
 MONGOOSE: "Primarily a relentless and escalating campaign of sabotage and small Cuban exile raids that would somehow cause the overthrow of Castro," which "also included plans for an invasion of Cuba in the fall of 1962".
 OAK: Operation to assassinate suspected South Vietnamese collaborators during Vietnam war.
 PANCHO: Carlos Castillo Armas, President of Guatemala, also RUFUS.
 PAPERCLIP: US recruiting of German scientists after World War II.
 PHOENIX: Vietnam covert intelligence/assassination operation.
 PINE
 RAINBOW: Project to reduce the radar cross section (RCS) of the Lockheed U-2 reconnaissance aircraft. Succeeded by GUSTO.
 QKWAVER:  Egypt
 RUFUS: Carlos Castillo Armas, President of Guatemala, also PANCHO.
 RYBAT: Secret
 SARANAC: Training site in Nicaragua.
 SCRANTON: Training base for radio operators near Nicaragua.
 SGCIDER: Germany
 SGUAT: CIA Station in Guatemala
 SHERWOOD: CIA radio broadcast program in Nicaragua begun on May 1, 1954.
 SKILLET: Whiting Willauer, U.S. Ambassador to Honduras.
 SKIMMER: The "Group" CIA cover organization supporting Castillo Armas.
 SLINC: Telegram indicator for PBSUCCESS Headquarters in Florida.
 STANDEL: Jacobo Arbenz, President of Guatemala.
 STARGATE: Investigation of psychic phenomena.
 STBAILEY: political action and propaganda part of STBARNUM
 STBARNUM: CIA Tibetan program (covert action in Tibet, 1950s onwards)
 STCIRCUS: aerial part of STBARNUM
 STSPIN: Three P-3A Orion aircraft operated from Taiwan in 1966.
 SYNCARP: The "Junta", Castillo Armas' political organization headed by Cordova Cerna.
 THERMOS: Unclassified codeword used in lieu of RAINBOW
 THROWOFF/2: Albanian ethnic agent/radio operator employed by Italian Navy Intelligence/CIA in several early Cold War covert operations against Albania. Was captured, operated radio under communist control to lure CIA agents to capture/death, tried in 1954, death sentence commuted, freed after 25 years. CIA paid his son $40,000 in 1996.
 OPERATION TILT: The CIA's name for "an operation put together by John Martino, who was fronting for his boss Santo Trafficante and his roommate  Johnny Roselli". OPERATION TILT used "some of the same people working on the CIA-Mafia plots in the spring of 1963 ... [and] involved sending a Cuban exile team into Cuba to retrieve Soviet technicians supposedly ready to defect and reveal the existence of Soviet missiles still on the island".
 TROPIC: Air operations flown over North Korea, China, and the Soviet Union by CAT pilots during the 1950s.
 VALUABLE: British MI-run Albanian operations 1949 to 1953.
 WASHTUB: Operation to plant Soviet arms in Nicaragua.
 WBFISHY: UK's Foreign and Commonwealth Office
 WSBURNT: Guatemala
 WSHOOFS: Honduras
 ZAPATA: Bay of Pigs Invasion 1961.

See also
 Secret Service codename
 List of U.S. government and military acronyms
 Callsign#Military call signs
 00 Agent#Inspiration
 List of military operations

Notes

Bibliography
 Agee, Philip. 1975. Inside the Company: CIA Diary. Stonehill Publishing , p. 48
 Carl, Leo D. 1990. The International Dictionary of Intelligence. Mavin Books, p. 107

 DPD Contracting Officer, Change of Project Funds Obligated under Contract No. SS-100. CIA DPD-2827-59, 30 April 1959.
 Helms, Richard and Hood, William. 2003. A Look Over My Shoulder: A Life in the Central Intelligence Agency. Random House, pp. 378–379
 Pedlow, Gregory W. and Welzenbach, Donald E. 1992. The Central Intelligence Agency and Overhead Reconnaissance: The U-2 and OXCART Programs, 1954–1974. CIA History Staff.
 
 Smith W. Thomas. 2003. Encyclopedia of the Central Intelligence Agency. Checkmark Books 
 Stockwell, John. 1978. In Search of Enemies
 Waldron, Lamar and Hartmann, Thom. 2009. Legacy of Secrecy: The Long Shadow of the JFK Assassination. Counterpoint (LS)
 Waldron, Lamar and Hartmann, Thom. 2005. Ultimate Sacrifice: John and Robert Kennedy, the Plan for a Coup in Cuba, and the Murder of JFK Carroll & Graf Publishers (US)
 Wallace, Robert and H. Keith Melton. 2008. Spycraft: The Secret History of the CIA's Spytechs from Communism to Al-Qaeda. Dutton.
 Weiner, Tim. 2008. Legacy of Ashes: The History of the CIA. Anchor Books.
 Wise, David. 1992. Molehunt. Random House, p. 19.

External links
 CIA Cryptonyms at Mary Ferrell Foundation
 Research Aid:  Cryptonyms and Terms in Declassified CIA Files
Acronyms/Abbreviations/Crypts/Organizations Identification Guide by the Assassination Records Review Board (ARRB)

 
Code names
Military terminology of the United States